Elisabeth Ellis, known as Lisa Ellis, is an American-born New Zealand political theorist and professor in the Department of Politics and Department of Philosophy at the University of Otago. Ellis is director of the Philosophy, Politics, and Economics (PPE) program at the University of Otago.

Academic career 
Ellis graduated with a BA (1990) from Princeton University and an MA (1992) and PhD (1999) from University of California, Berkeley. She joined the University of Otago as associate professor in January 2014 and was promoted to full professor in December 2018 with effect from 1 February 2019.

Selected works

References

External links 

 
 
 
 

Living people
Year of birth missing (living people)
New Zealand women academics
Princeton University alumni
University of California, Berkeley alumni
Academic staff of the University of Otago
American women political scientists
American political scientists
American women academics
21st-century American women